The Dinesen-Motzfeldt-Hettninger Log House is located in the community of Mole Lake, Wisconsin in the city of Crandon, Wisconsin. It was added to the National Register of Historic Places in 2005.

History

The house was first occupied by William Johnson. It was later occupied by Danish immigrant Wilhelm Dinesen, the father of Karen Blixen. During the time Dinesen lived in the house, he called it "Frydenlund", translating to 'grove of joy.' Later, the house became the home of Ludwig Motzfeldt, who also ran a post office of the building and served as Treasurer of Forest County, Wisconsin. In 1905, Joseph and Hattie Hettinger purchased the house.

See also

 Frydenlund
 Rungstedlund

References

Danish-American culture in Wisconsin
Houses on the National Register of Historic Places in Wisconsin
Houses in Forest County, Wisconsin
Log houses in the United States
National Register of Historic Places in Forest County, Wisconsin
Log buildings and structures on the National Register of Historic Places in Wisconsin
Buildings and structures associated with the Dinesen family